The Helsinki Final Act, also known as Helsinki Accords or Helsinki Declaration was the document signed at the closing meeting of the third phase of the Conference on Security and Co-operation in Europe (CSCE) held in Helsinki, Finland, between 30 July and 1 August 1975, following two years of negotiations known as the Helsinki Process. All then-existing European countries (except  Andorra and pro-Chinese Albania) as well as the United States and Canada, altogether 35 participating states, signed the Final Act in an attempt to improve the détente between the East and the West. The Helsinki Accords, however, were not binding as they did not have treaty status that would have to be ratified by parliaments. Sometimes the term "Helsinki pact(s)" was also used unofficially.

Articles 
In the CSCE terminology, there were four groupings or baskets. In the first basket, the "Declaration on Principles Guiding Relations between Participating States" (also known as "The Decalogue") enumerated the following 10 points:

The second basket promised economic, scientific, and technological cooperation; facilitating business contacts and industrial cooperation; linking together transportation networks; and increasing the flow of information. The third basket involved commitments to improve the human context of family reunions, marriages and travel. It also sought to improve the conditions of journalists and expand cultural exchanges. The fourth basket dealt with procedures to monitor implementation, and to plan future meetings.

Freedom of information

The United States had sought a provision that would prohibit radio jamming but it failed to find consensus due to Soviet opposition. Despite this, the West believed jamming was illegal under the agreed upon language for "expansion of the dissemination of information broadcast by radio". The Soviet Union believed that jamming was a legally justified response to broadcasts they argued were a violation of the Helsinki Accords' broad purpose to "meet the interest of mutual understanding among people and the aims set forth by the Conference".

Ford administration 
When President Gerald Ford came into office in August 1974, the Conference on Security and Co-operation in Europe (CSCE) negotiations had been underway for nearly two years. Although the USSR was looking for a rapid resolution, none of the parties were quick to make concessions, particularly on human rights points. Throughout much of the negotiations, US leaders were disengaged and uninterested with the process. In August 1974, National Security Advisor and Secretary of State Henry Kissinger said to Ford "we never wanted it but we went along with the Europeans [...] It is meaningless — it is just a grandstand play to the left. We are going along with it."

In the months leading up to the conclusion of negotiations and signing of the Helsinki Final Act, the American public, in particular Americans of Eastern European descent voiced their concerns that the agreement would mean the acceptance of Soviet domination over Eastern Europe and forced incorporation of the Baltic States into the USSR. President Ford was concerned about this as well and sought clarification on this issue from the US National Security Council.

The US Senate was also worried about the fate of the Baltic States and the CSCE in general. Several senators wrote to President Ford requesting that the final summit stage be delayed until all matters had been settled, and in a way favorable to the West. Ford also attracted criticism from a wide range of political spectrum when he refused to meet with Soviet dissident Aleksandr Solzhenitsyn to avoid damaging Soviet Union–United States relations before the conference.

Shortly before President Ford departed for Helsinki, he held a meeting with a group of Americans of Eastern European background, and stated definitively that US policy on the Baltic States would not change, but would be strengthened since the agreement denies the annexation of territory in violation of international law and allows for the peaceful change of borders.

Ford in July 1975 told the delegation of Americans from East European backgrounds that:

His reassurances had little effect. The volume of negative mail continued to grow. The American public was still unconvinced that American policy on the incorporation of the Baltic States would not be changed by the Helsinki Final Act. Despite protests from all around, Ford decided to move forward and sign the agreement. As domestic criticism mounted, Ford hedged on his support for the Helsinki Accords, which had the impact of overall weakening his foreign-policy stature.

Ronald Reagan made the Accords a centerpiece of his campaign against Ford for the 1976 Republican Party presidential primaries. During the general election, the Democratic nominee Jimmy Carter attacked the Accords as a legitimation of the "Soviet domination of Eastern Europe." A debate about the Accords in this vein during the 1976 United States presidential debates led to an infamous presidential gaffe in which Ford claimed that there was "no Soviet domination of Eastern Europe, and there never will be under a Ford administration." His blunder in the debate with Carter when he denied Kremlin control of Poland proved disastrous.

Reception and impact 
 
The document was seen both as a significant step toward reducing Cold War tensions and as a major diplomatic boost for the Soviet Union at the time, due to its clauses on the inviolability of national frontiers and respect for territorial integrity, which were seen to consolidate the USSR's territorial gains in Eastern Europe following World War II. Considering objections from Canada, Spain, Ireland and other states, the Final Act simply stated that "frontiers" in Europe should be stable but could change by peaceful internal means. US president Gerald Ford also reaffirmed that US non-recognition policy of the Baltic States' (Lithuania, Latvia and Estonia) forced incorporation into the Soviet Union had not changed. Leaders of other NATO member states made similar statements.

However, the civil rights portion of the agreement provided the basis for the work of the Helsinki Watch, an independent non-governmental organization created to monitor compliance to the Helsinki Accords (which evolved into several regional committees, eventually forming the International Helsinki Federation and Human Rights Watch). While these provisions applied to all signatories, the focus of attention was on their application to the Soviet Union and its Warsaw Pact allies, including Bulgaria, Czechoslovakia, the German Democratic Republic (East Germany), Hungary, Poland, and Romania. Soviet propaganda presented the Final Act as a great triumph for Soviet diplomacy and for Brezhnev personally.

In practice, the Soviet government significantly curbed the rule of law, civil liberties, protection of law and guarantees of property, which were considered examples of "bourgeois morality" by Soviet legal theorists such as Andrey Vyshinsky. The Soviet Union signed legally-binding human rights documents, but they were neither widely known or accessible to people living under Communist rule, nor were they taken seriously by the Communist authorities. Human rights activists in the Soviet Union were regularly subjected to harassment, repressions and arrests.

According to the Cold War scholar John Lewis Gaddis in his book The Cold War: A New History (2005), "Leonid Brezhnev had looked forward, Anatoly Dobrynin recalls, to the 'publicity he would gain... when the Soviet public learned of the final settlement of the postwar boundaries for which they had sacrificed so much'... '[Instead, the Helsinki Accords] gradually became a manifesto of the dissident and liberal movement'... What this meant was that the people who lived under these [communist] systems — at least the more courageous — could claim official permission to say what they thought."

The then-People's Republic of Albania refused to participate in the Accords, its leader Enver Hoxha arguing, "All the satellites of the Soviets with the possible exception of the Bulgarians want to break the shackles of the Warsaw Treaty, but they cannot. Then their only hope is that which the Helsinki document allows them, that is, to strengthen their friendship with the United States of America and the West, to seek investments from them in the form of credits and imports of their technology without any restrictions, to allow the church to occupy its former place, to deepen the moral degeneration, to increase the anti-Sovietism, and the Warsaw Treaty will remain an empty egg-shell."

The Helsinki Accords served as the groundwork for the later Organization for Security and Cooperation in Europe (OSCE), established in 1995 under the Paris Charter of 1990.

Signatory states 

 
 
  Bulgaria
 
 
  Czechoslovakia
 
 
 
 
 
 
  Hungary
 
 
 
 
 
 
 
 
 
  Poland
 
  Romania
 
 
  Spain

Heads of state or government  
This also influenced the act's headers consecutively in German, English, Spanish, French, Italian and Russian, which were also the conference's working languages and languages of the act itself.  

 Helmut Schmidt, Chancellor of the Federal Republic of Germany
 Erich Honecker, First Secretary of the Central Committee of the Socialist Unity Party of Germany
 Gerald Ford, President of the United States
 Bruno Kreisky, Chancellor of Austria
 Leo Tindemans, Prime Minister of Belgium
 Todor Zhivkov, Chairman of the State Council of Bulgaria
 Pierre Trudeau, Prime Minister of Canada
 Makarios III, President of Cyprus
 Anker Jørgensen, Prime Minister of Denmark
 Carlos Arias Navarro, Prime Minister of Spain
 Urho Kekkonen, President of Finland
 Valéry Giscard d’Estaing, President of France (who also serves as Co-Prince of Andorra however no such function at all is mentioned in the declaration)
 Harold Wilson, Prime Minister of the United Kingdom
 Konstantinos Karamanlis, Prime Minister of Greece
 János Kádár, First Secretary of the Central Committee of the Hungarian Socialist Workers' Party
 Liam Cosgrave, Taoiseach of Ireland
 Geir Hallgrímsson, Prime Minister of Iceland
 Aldo Moro, Prime Minister of Italy
 Walter Kieber, Prime Minister of Liechtenstein
 Gaston Thorn, Prime Minister of Luxembourg
 Dom Mintoff, Prime Minister of Malta
 André Saint-Mleux, Minister of State of Monaco
 Trygve Bratteli, Prime Minister of Norway
 Joop den Uyl, Prime Minister of the Netherlands
 Edward Gierek, First Secretary of the Polish United Workers' Party
 Francisco da Costa Gomes, President of Portugal
 Nicolae Ceaușescu, President of Romania
 Gian Luigi Berti, Captain Regent of San Marino
 Agostino Casaroli, Cardinal Secretary of State
 Olof Palme, Prime Minister of Sweden
 Pierre Graber, President of the Swiss Confederation
 Gustáv Husák, President of Czechoslovakia
 Süleyman Demirel, Prime Minister of Turkey
 Leonid Brezhnev, General Secretary of the Communist Party of the Soviet Union
 Josip Broz Tito, President of Yugoslavia

International organizations
 Kurt Waldheim, Secretary-General of the United Nations (giving the opening speech "as their guest of honour", non-signatory)

See also
 Charter 77 and Moscow Helsinki Group, Czechoslovak and Soviet/Russian dissident initiatives that appealed to the Helsinki Accords

References

Further reading
 Korey, William. The Promises We Keep: Human Rights, the Helsinki Process, and American Foreign Policy (St. Martin's Press, 1993).
 Morgan, Michael Cotey. The Final Act: The Helsinki Accords and the Transformation of the Cold War. (Princeton UP, 2018).
 Nuti, Leopoldo, ed. The Crisis of Détente in Europe: From Helsinki to Gorbachev 1975-1985 (Routledge, 2008).
 Snyder, Sarah B. "Through the Looking Glass: The Helsinki Final Act and the 1976 Election for President." Diplomacy & Statecraft 21.1 (2010): 87-106. it helped defeat Gerald Ford
 Thomas, Daniel C. "The Helsinki accords and political change in Eastern Europe." Cambridge Studies in International Relations 66 (1999): 205–233.|
 Thomas, Daniel C. The Helsinki Effect: International Norms, Human Rights, and the Demise of Communism. Princeton UP, 2001. 
 Wenger, Andreas, Vojtech Mastny, and Christian Nünlist, eds. Origins of the European security system: the Helsinki Process revisited, 1965-75. (Routledge, 2008).
 Kieninger, Stephan, Dynamic Détente: The United States and Europe, 1964–1975 (Lexington Books, 2016).
 Badalassi, Nicolas, and Sarah B. Snyder, eds. The CSCE and the End of the Cold War: Diplomacy, Societies and Human Rights, 1972-1990 (Berghahn Books, 2018).

External links

Full text of the Final Act, 1975 Conference on Security and Co-operation in Europe
United States Helsinki Commission
 Scan of the original copy with signatures (PDF)
Signing of the Final Act on August 1st 1975
OSCE Magazine October 2005: Special anniversary issue: 30 years of the Helsinki Final Act, 1975-2005
The Helsinki process and the death of communism
Interview with Henry Kissinger discusses Helsinki Accords during Soviet Repression in Poland from the Dean Peter Krogh Foreign Affairs Digital Archives
The Helsinki Final Act: Resources for Understanding its Creation, Implementation and Legacy (see the nameplates at the photo)

Cold War treaties
1970s in Helsinki
1975 in Finland
Treaties concluded in 1975
1975 in the European Economic Community
1975 in international relations
July 1975 events in Europe
August 1975 events in Europe
Events in Helsinki
East Germany–West Germany relations